The 2011 Gyeongryeolbi island fishing incident occurred on March 2, 2011 in Taean County, in South Chungcheong Do, South Korea, at 3 pm at  southwest off Gyeongryeolbi island between People’s Republic of China fishing boats and the South Korea Coast Guard.

Incident
Seven Chinese fishing boats were spotted by a patrol boat from the South Korea Coast Guard. Two of the 30 ton Chinese boats entered  into the South Korea Exclusive Economic Zone illegally.  Korean authorities used fire extinguishers to disperse the boats, then sent out two speedboats and seized two of the boats after a 10-minute chase.

When boarding the boat, violence broke out. The fisherman began swinging axes and hammers. The Korean officers fired 10 blanks and live shotgun ammunition. One of the shot penetrated hit left ankle of one Chinese fisherman.  Two people were injured in total, including one Chinese fisherman and one Korean coast guard.

Aftermath
The fisherman shot was sent to a hospital in Gunsan by helicopter.  According to the Coast Guard, this was the first time shots were fired for illegal fishing in the Yellow Sea.

See also
 2010 Eocheong boat collision incident
 2011 Incheon fishing incident

References

Gyeongryeolbi island fishing incident
Gyeongryeolbi island fishing incident
China–South Korea relations
Fishing conflicts